Lesbian, gay, bisexual, and transgender (LGBT) people in  Bolivia face legal challenges not experienced by non-LGBT residents. Both male and female same-sex sexual activity are legal in Bolivia. The Bolivian Constitution bans discrimination on the basis of sexual orientation and gender identity, making Bolivia one of the only few countries in the world to have such constitutional protections for LGBT people. In 2016, Bolivia passed a comprehensive gender identity law, seen as one of the most progressive laws relating to transgender people in the world. 

Following a decision from the Inter-American Court of Human Rights in January 2018, recognising same-sex marriage as a right under the American Convention on Human Rights and which set binding precedent for Bolivian courts, and pending a decision from the Plurinational Constitutional Court, the Civil Registry Service announced its intention on 9 December 2020 to issue civil union ("free union") certificates offering all of the legal rights, benefits and responsibilities of marriage to same-sex couples. As of January 2023, there are fifteen same-sex couples who have managed to officially register their free union based on the application of Advisory Opinion OC-24/17 of November 24, 2017  issued by the Inter-American Court of Human Rights.

Nevertheless, reports of discrimination against LGBT people are not uncommon. In 2017, the Bolivian Ombudsman reported that 64 LGBT people had been murdered in the country that year, of which only 14 cases had been investigated and none which resulted in a sentence.

History
Prior to Spanish colonisation, various indigenous peoples inhabited modern-day Bolivia. Among these were the Quechua people (including the Incas), the Aymara people, the Guaraní people, the Chiquitano, and the Moxo, among others. Homosexuality and same-sex relationships has been documented among these people groups, with varying levels of acceptance.

The Moxo, Chiquitano, Guaraní and Chiriguanos peoples tended to view homosexuality with indifference. The Aymara people regarded homosexuals as supernatural beings and shamans, capable of magic. However, this past acceptance and openness are not so present in modern times. The conversion to Christianity, which traditionally has regarded homosexuality as sinful, has resulted in a climate of homophobia and persecution for LGBT people. This is notably true among the Aymara, whose popular culture now regards homosexuality as a synonym to infidelity or bad luck. The traditional perception of homosexuality, especially male homosexuality, by the Incas is still unclear and is the subject of ongoing debates. Nonetheless, it seems as though homosexuality was a tolerated "act of worship" in religious rituals, and traditions of cross-dressing priests (known as ) who would perform religious rituals also existed. Lesbians (known as ) seem to have been highly regarded by the Incas. Following the Spanish conquest, sodomy, whether conducted by heterosexual or homosexual partners, became punishable with burning at the stake.

Legality of same-sex sexual activity 
Same-sex sexual activity has been legal since 1832.

The age of consent in Bolivia is set at 14 per article 308bis (known as "Rape of Infants, Girls, Boys and Adolescents" (Violación Infantes, Niña, Niño y Adolescentes)) of the Criminal Code, which punishes rape (violación) of children under 14, "even without the use of force or intimidation and when consent is alleged" (así no haya uso de la fuerza o intimidación y se alegue consentimiento). There is a close in age exemption of three years.

Recognition of same-sex relationships 

Article 63 of the Constitution of Bolivia limits marriage to opposite-sex couples. In July 2010, following the legalisation of same-sex marriage in Argentina, Vice President Álvaro García Linera said that the government had no plans to legalize same-sex marriage.

In April 2012, a member of the opposition coalition, the National Convergence, introduced a bill in the Plurinational Legislative Assembly to legalize same-sex civil unions. However, the bill stalled and was not approved. Multiple similar proposals were introduced in the following years, but all stalled due to opposition from the Catholic Church and several members of the governing Movement for Socialism party.

On January 9, 2018, the Inter-American Court of Human Rights (IACHR) ruled that countries signatory to the American Convention on Human Rights, of which Bolivia is a signatory, are required to allow same-sex couples to marry. Following the decision, a same-sex couple, David Aruquipa Pérez and Guido Montaño Durán, went to a Civil Registry Service (SERECI) office in La Paz in October 2018 seeking to formalise their 9-year-old relationship as a free union, which are offered the same rights as marriages. The Registry refused, but on 9 December 2020, following a court ruling in favour of the couple by the Second Constitutional Chamber of the La Paz Departmental Court of Justice on 3 July 2020, it reversed its position. It issued "Resolution 003/2020", ordering the registration of the free union of Aruquipa Pérez and Montaño Durán. The couple finally registered their union on 18 December 2020. This decision sets a precedent for other same-sex couples to access this recognition in Bolivia. LGBT groups described the decision as "historic".

In May 2021, however, a SERECI office in La Paz refused to register the relationship of a lesbian couple. A lawyer representing the couple argued that this denial is contradictory to the Registry's own resolution issued in December 2020.

On May 13, 2022, another same-sex couple managed to register their free union based on the Advisory Opinion OC-24/17, after a year of waiting and bureaucratic procedures. On May 27, 2022, a third same-sex couple was able to formalize their free union by registering their relationship with the Civil Registry Service of the city of Santa Cruz, whose administrative process lasted more than a year.

On October 7, 2022, a fourth couple officially registered their free union in the offices of the Civic Registry Service of La Paz. The process lasted a month according to the couple.
In January 2023, the LGBT organization MANODIVERSA reported that, nationwide, fifteen same-sex couples have managed to register their free union, mainly in the cities of Santa Cruz, La Paz and Cochabamba.

Adoption and parenting 

same-sex couples are permitted to adopt in Bolivia. Couples may not adopt jointly unless the couple is legally married or in a free union.

Single people, regardless of their sexual orientation, may adopt children, according to Article 84 of the Child and Adolescent Code.

Discrimination protections 
Article 14(II) of the Constitution of Bolivia, implemented in February 2009, prohibits and punishes discrimination based on sexual orientation and gender identity.

Anti-discrimination law 
The Law Against Racism and All Forms of Discrimination defines discrimination as "any form of distinction, exclusion, restriction or preference based on sex, colour, age, sexual orientation and gender identity, origin, culture, nationality, citizenship, language, religion, ideology, political or philosophical affiliation, marital status, economic, social or health status, profession, occupation, level of education, disabilities and/or physical disabilities, intellectual or sensory impairment, pregnancy, origin, physical appearance, clothing, surname or other that have the purpose or effect of nullifying or impairing the recognition, enjoyment or exercise, on an equal footing, of human rights and fundamental freedoms recognized by the Constitution and international law." It also provides definitions for homophobia and transphobia.

The law amended article 281 of the Penal Code to criminalize discrimination based on sexual orientation or gender identity. It also bans "dissemination and incitement to racism and discrimination", stating that anyone who "through any means broadcasts ideas based on racial superiority or hatred, or that promote or justify racism or any kind of discrimination on the grounds described above, or that incite to violence or persecution of people, based on racist or discriminatory motives will be imprisoned from one to five years."

Despite these protections, reports of societal discrimination against LGBT people are not uncommon.

Hate crime law 
Since 2010, article 40bis of the Penal Code aggravates the penalties of crimes motivated by any of the discriminatory grounds included in article 281ter, including sexual orientation and gender identity. In May 2016, the LGBT rights group Colectivo de Lesbianas, Gays, Bisexuales y personas Transgénero presented to the Plurinational Legislative Assembly a draft law against hate crimes based on sexual orientation or gender identity, which includes a penalty of 30 years imprisonment.

Transgender rights 
On 25 November 2015, a law was proposed that would allow transgender people to change their legal name and sex. On 19 May 2016, the Chamber of Deputies passed the Gender Identity Law. One day later, the Chamber of Senators passed the measure by simple majority votes. On 21 May 2016, the legislation was signed into law by Vice President Álvaro García Linera, and it took effect on 1 August 2016. In October 2016, the Bolivian Congress debated whether to repeal it.

The law allows individuals over 18 to legally change their name, sex and photography on legal documents. A psychological test proving that the person knows and voluntarily assumes the change of identity is required, but sex reassignment surgery is not. The process is confidential and must be carried out before the Civil Registry Service. The processing of the new documentation will take 15 days. The change of name and sex will be reversible once, after which they cannot modify these data again.

The newly assigned sex is not, however, recognized for the purpose of marriage. In June 2017, the Supreme Electoral Tribunal instructed the Civil Registry Service to recognize the newly assigned sex of transgender people in their requests to marry. In November 2017, the Supreme Court of Bolivia invalidated this instruction, ruling it unconstitutional, and declaring that a sex changed under the law may not be recognized for the purpose of marriage. LGBT groups filed an appeal with the Inter-American Court of Human Rights in May 2018.

Military service 
The Armed Forces of Bolivia announced in 2013 that LGBT citizens would be allowed to serve beginning in 2015. Bolivia also allows transgender people to serve openly in the military. Despite this, homosexuality in the military is still viewed as taboo, and LGBT individuals may want to remain discreet about their sexual orientation or gender identity.

Blood donation 
Since 10 July 2019, the Supreme Decree 24547 of 1997 has permitted men who have sex with men to donate blood.

Previously, the decree banned homosexual and bisexual men from donating blood, labelling them "a high-risk group". In June 2016, the Ombudsman asked the government to amend the decree, stating that the Law Against Racism and All Forms of Discrimination forbids discrimination based on sexual orientation.

Public opinion 
A 2013 Pew Research Center opinion survey showed that 43% of Bolivians believed that homosexuality should be accepted by society, while 49% believed it should not. Younger people were more accepting: 53% of people between 18 and 29 believed it should be accepted, 43% of people between 30 and 49 and 27% of people over 50.

In May 2015, PlanetRomeo, an LGBT social network, published its first Gay Happiness Index (GHI). Gay men from over 120 countries were asked about how they feel about society’s view on homosexuality, how do they experience the way they are treated by other people and how satisfied are they with their lives. Bolivia was ranked 48th with a GHI score of 47.

According to a 2017 poll carried out by ILGA, 60% of Bolivians agreed that gay, lesbian and bisexual people should enjoy the same rights as straight people, while 17% disagreed. Additionally, 64% agreed that they should be protected from workplace discrimination. 26% of Bolivians, however, said that people who are in same-sex relationships should be charged as criminals, while a plurality of 45% disagreed. As for transgender people, 64% agreed that they should have the same rights, 63% believed they should be protected from employment discrimination and 53% believed they should be allowed to change their legal gender.

The 2017 AmericasBarometer showed that 35% of Bolivians supported same-sex marriage.

Summary table

See also 

 Human rights in Bolivia
LGBT rights in the Americas

Bibliography

Notes

References